Caterina Gabanella (born 11 September 1988) is an Italian former competitive figure skater. She is the 2005 Merano Cup bronze medalist and 2006 Italian national bronze medalist. She reached the free skate at the 2006 World Junior Championships and finished 17th overall.

Programs

Competitive highlights 
JGP: Junior Grand Prix

References

External links 
 

1988 births
Italian female single skaters
Living people
Sportspeople from Bolzano
20th-century Italian women
21st-century Italian women